Robin Berry Janvrin, Baron Janvrin,  (born 20 September 1946) is a British naval officer, diplomat, and courtier who was private secretary to Elizabeth II from February 1999 to September 2007.

Early life
Born in Cheltenham, Gloucestershire, Robin Berry Janvrin is the son of Vice Admiral Sir Richard Janvrin and Nancy Fielding. He was educated at Marlborough College, Britannia Royal Naval College, Dartmouth, and Brasenose College, Oxford, from which he received a first class bachelor's degree in philosophy, politics and economics in 1969, and of which he was made an Honorary Fellow in 1999. In 1962, he was selected to attend Camp Rising Sun in upstate New York.

Career
Janvrin entered the Royal Navy in 1964, was commissioned as an acting sub-lieutenant on 1 September 1966, promoted lieutenant on 4 March 1971, and served until 2 July 1975. He subsequently became a member of the Castaways' Club. On leaving the navy, Janvrin joined the Foreign and Commonwealth Office. He was a Second Secretary in 1975 and was appointed First Secretary at the mission to NATO in 1976. He was officially appointed an Officer of the Diplomatic Service on 7 February 1979. Janvrin was First Secretary in New Delhi from 1981 to 1984, during which time he was made a member of the 4th Class of the Royal Victorian Order for services during the Queen's state visit to India.

Janvrin was then counsellor and deputy head of the Department for the Personnel Department of the Foreign and Commonwealth Office from 1985 to 1987.

On 1 June 1987 Janvrin was recruited as press secretary to the Queen, though it was initially thought that he would be appointed assistant press secretary. On 19 October 1990 he became assistant private secretary to the Queen, and in 1996 the deputy private secretary. He was promoted a commander of the Royal Victorian Order in the 1994 New Year Honours, a companion of the Order of the Bath in the 1997 New Year Honours, and a knight commander of the Royal Victorian Order in the 1998 New Year Honours,. In February 1999 he succeeded Sir Robert Fellowes (later Lord Fellowes) as private secretary to the sovereign. He was promoted to knight commander of the Order of the Bath in the 2003 New Year Honours.

Janvrin was also a trustee of the Queen's 80th Birthday Trust, and is the chairman of trustees of The Royal Foundation of The Duke and Duchess of Cambridge and Prince Harry.

Janvrin retired in September 2007, and was succeeded as private secretary by Christopher Geidt. He was promoted to Knight Grand Cross of the Order of the Bath in the 2007 Birthday Honours and, on 24 July, it was announced that Janvrin would be made a life peer, as one of the ten public servants per Parliament whom the Prime Minister may nominate for a peerage upon their retirement. His title was gazetted as Baron Janvrin, of Chalford Hill in the County of Gloucestershire on 10 October, and he sits as a crossbencher in the House of Lords. On the day of his retirement, 8 September, Janvrin was also promoted to Knight Grand Cross of the Royal Victorian Order by the Queen. In October, the Queen appointed Lord Janvrin to be a permanent lord-in-waiting in the royal household.

In the 2008 New Zealand New Year Honours, Lord Janvrin was made a companion of the Queen's Service Order for "services to New Zealand as Private Secretary to The Queen".

On 7 January 2008 Janvrin took up his appointment of deputy chairman, HSBC Private Bank (UK). Janvrin is also chairman of The Leadership Council, a research and thought leadership body in the UK. In 2008, he replaced Sir Christopher Mallaby as president of the British Entente Cordiale Scholarship trust.

Marriage
Janvrin married Isabelle de Boissonneaux de Chevigny, daughter of Yann de Boissonneaux de Chevigny, in 1977.

In popular culture
Janvrin was portrayed by Roger Allam in Stephen Frears' The Queen (2006) starring Oscar-winner Dame Helen Mirren. The film, which deals with the immediate aftermath of the death of Diana, Princess of Wales, in 1997, inaccurately portrays Janvrin, then deputy private secretary to the Sovereign, as private secretary. In 1997, the position of Private Secretary was occupied by Robert Fellowes - who was also Diana's brother-in-law, being married to her sister Jane.

Honours
CB: Companion of the Order of the Bath, 1997
KCB: Knight Commander of the Order of the Bath, 2003
GCB: Knight Grand Cross of the Order of the Bath, 16 June 2007
LVO: Lieutenant of the Royal Victorian Order, 1983 (regraded from MVO 4th Class in 1984)
CVO: Commander of the Royal Victorian Order, 1994
KCVO: Knight Commander of the Royal Victorian Order, 1998
GCVO: Knight Grand Cross of the Royal Victorian Order, 8 September 2007
Life Peerage: 10 October 2007
QSO: Companion of the Queen's Service Order, 2008
 Commemorative Medal for the Centennial of Saskatchewan, ''2005
 Saskatchewan Distinguished Service Award
 He received the Queen Elizabeth II Version of the Royal Household Long and Faithful Service Medal for 20 years of service to the Royal Family in June 2007. He retired from Royal Service soon after receiving it.

Styles
Mr Robin Janvrin 1946–1983
Mr Robin Janvrin  1983–1984
Mr Robin Janvrin  1984–1994
Mr Robin Janvrin  1994–1997
Mr Robin Janvrin  1997–1998
The Rt Hon Sir Robin Janvrin  1998–2003
The Rt Hon Sir Robin Janvrin  2003 – 16 June 2007
The Rt Hon Sir Robin Janvrin  16 June 2007 – 8 September 2007
The Rt Hon Sir Robin Janvrin  8 September 2007 – 10 October 2007
The Rt Hon The Lord Janvrin  10 October 2007 – 2008
The Rt Hon The Lord Janvrin  2008–present

References

1946 births
Living people
Alumni of Brasenose College, Oxford
Crossbench life peers
Graduates of Britannia Royal Naval College
Knights Grand Cross of the Order of the Bath
Knights Grand Cross of the Royal Victorian Order
Members of the Privy Council of the United Kingdom
People educated at Marlborough College
Permanent Lords-in-Waiting
People from Cheltenham
Royal Navy officers
Companions of the Queen's Service Order
Private Secretaries to the Sovereign
Deputy Private Secretaries to the Sovereign
Assistant Private Secretaries to the Sovereign
Camp Rising Sun alumni
Life peers created by Elizabeth II